In Like Flynn is a 2018 Australian biographical film about the early life of actor Errol Flynn. Based on the story of Australian war-veteran and actor Errol Flynn, the plot follows the early days of his life before reaching fame as a celebrity between the 1930s and the 1950s. Before reaching fame, Flynn was an adventurous Australian who gambled and explored the outback before going off to Papua New Guinea. The films stars Thomas Cocquerel, Corey Large, William Moseley, Clive Standen, Callan Mulvey, Isabel Lucas, and Nathalie Kelley. The title of the film is a play on words of Errol Flynn's name and the slang phrase "In like Flynn."

Plot
After retrieving a map from a dead gold prospector, Errol Flynn believes it will lead him to gold in Papua New Guinea, and convinces three men to accompany him on a voyage up the east coast of Australia. They leave Sydney on the yacht Sirocco, which Flynn had stolen from Chinese opium smugglers. During their journey, Flynn and his crew encounter a number of challenges, including the Chinese crew attempting to intercept them, desperate to reclaim the yacht and the opium they have hidden on board.

Cast
 Thomas Cocquerel as Errol Flynn
 Corey Large as Rex
 William Moseley as Dook Adams
 Clive Standen as Charlie
 Callan Mulvey as Johnson
 David Wenham as Christian Travers
 David Hennessey as Rudolph
 Isabel Lucas as Rose
 Nathalie Kelley as Zaca
 Grace Huang as Achun
 Costas Mandylor as Vassilis
 Vanessa Moltzen as Nurse
 Lochlyn Munro as Ronald
 Dan Fogler as Joel Schwartz
 Nathan Jones as The Mountain
 Andy McPhee as Bar Keep
 Melanie Zanetti as Frank's Girl
 Ashlee Lollback as Olivia de Havilland
 Jon Quested as Bar Patron
 Alexandra MacDonald as Flapper
 Raoul Craemer as Michael Curtiz

Filming
Filming for In Like Flynn began on the Gold Coast in Queensland in May 2017. Additional filming took place in Mount Tamborine, Queensland. William Moseley joined the cast in November 2016, playing the character Dook Adams. In June 2017, Isabel Lucas joined the cast, playing the role of Rose. In July 2017, Corey Large and Thomas Cocquerel joined the cast.

Release
The film was released to Australian cinemas on 11 October 2018. It was later released worldwide on 25 January 2019.

Reception
On Rotten Tomatoes the film has an approval rating of  based on reviews from  critics.

See also

 Cinema of Australia

References

External links

Films directed by Russell Mulcahy
Australian adventure films
Australian biographical films
2018 films
Films shot in Queensland
Biographical films about actors
2010s biographical films
Films based on biographies
Films set in 1930
Films set in 1935
Films set in the 1930s
Films set in Papua New Guinea
Films set in Sydney
Films set in Queensland
Films set in Los Angeles
2010s English-language films
2010s Australian films